Nicholas Le Poer Trench, 9th Earl of Clancarty, 8th Marquess of Heusden (born 1 May 1952), is an Anglo-Irish peer, as well as a nobleman in the Dutch nobility. Lord Clancarty serves as an elected Crossbench hereditary peer in the British House of Lords. His earldom is in the Peerage of Ireland. He was educated at Westminster School. He also studied at Ashford Grammar School, Plymouth Polytechnic, University of Colorado, Denver, USA, and Sheffield University.

Family
Lord Clancarty was born in Uxbridge, on 1 May 1952, the only son of Power Edward Ford Le Poer Trench, second son of the fifth Earl from his second marriage. He is married to the journalist Victoria Lambert and has one daughter with her.

Membership of House of Lords
In 1995 he succeeded to the titles on the death of his childless uncle, Brinsley Le Poer Trench, 8th Earl of Clancarty. He took his seat in the House of Lords at this time as Viscount Clancarty, a title in the Peerage of the United Kingdom, because titles in the Peerage of Ireland did not entitle their holders to sit even before the House of Lords Act 1999 removed the majority of the hereditary peers.

Under the terms of that Act, Clancarty lost his automatic right to a seat; he was unsuccessful in the election by the Crossbench hereditary peers of 28 of their number to continue to sit after the Act came into force, finishing 37th in a field of 79 candidates.

He was an unsuccessful candidate in four by-elections caused by the deaths of sitting hereditary peers, being runner-up on two occasions. In 2010 he returned to the House after winning the by-election to replace the 4th Viscount Colville of Culross.

Besides being a British and an Irish peer, he also belongs to the Dutch nobility as Marquess of Heusden. Besides H.M. King Willem-Alexander of the Netherlands, who is also Marquess of Veere and Vlissingen, Lord Clancarty is the only marquess in Dutch nobility.

Career
Clancarty is a self-employed artist, freelance writer, and translator.

References

External links 

Official biography at House of Lords
Nick Trench blog
Profile at TheyWorkForYou.com
Twitter page

1952 births
Living people
People educated at Westminster School, London
Nicholas
Marquess of Heusden
Crossbench hereditary peers
Earls of Clancarty

Clancarty
Clancarty